"Light On" is a song recorded by British singer Rebecca Ferguson. Written by Alexander Geringas and Nikki Leonti and produced by Geringas, it was released in German-speaking Europe on 28 December 2013 as the second single from Ferguson's second studio album Freedom (2013).

Background
"Light On" was released as the second single from the album after a television performance of the track; it entered the German Top 40 singles.

Track listing

Chart performance

Weekly charts

Release history

References

Rebecca Ferguson (singer) songs
2013 singles
Songs written by Alexander Geringas
Syco Music singles
2013 songs